This is a list of the coats of arms of North American countries.

Sovereign states

Dependencies and other territories

See also

 Flags of North America
 Armorial of sovereign states
 Armorial of Africa
 Armorial of South America
 Armorial of Asia
 Armorial of Europe
 Armorial of Oceania

External links

North America
North America-related lists
 
North America
North America